Michael Allen Wall (born February 1, 1946) is an American former competition swimmer who participated in two consecutive Summer Olympics.

At the 1964 Summer Olympics in Tokyo, Wall competed for the gold medal-winning U.S. team in the preliminary heats of the men's 4×200-meter freestyle relay.  Four years later at the 1968 Summer Olympics in Mexico City, he swam for the first-place U.S. teams in the qualifying heats of the men's 4×100-meter freestyle relay and men's 4×200-meter freestyle relay.  He did not, however, receive a medal for either performance; until 1984, under international swimming rules, relay swimmers were not eligible for a medal unless they swam in the event finals.

Wall attended Stanford University, where he swam for the Stanford Cardinal swimming and diving team in National Collegiate Athletic Association (NCAA) competition.  Wall was a member of Stanford's 1967 NCAA national championship relay team in the 800-yard relay, which set new NCAA and American records for the event with a time of 6:54.65.  He was also a key points contributor in Stanford's NCAA national team championship in 1967.

See also
 List of Stanford University people
 World record progression 4 × 200 metres freestyle relay

References

External links
 

1946 births
Living people
American male freestyle swimmers
Olympic swimmers of the United States
Swimmers from Atlanta
Stanford Cardinal men's swimmers
Swimmers at the 1964 Summer Olympics
Swimmers at the 1968 Summer Olympics
Universiade medalists in swimming
Universiade gold medalists for the United States
Medalists at the 1965 Summer Universiade